= Johnson Chow Su-sing =

Chinese-Canadian painter of the traditional Wu School

- Chinese: 周士心
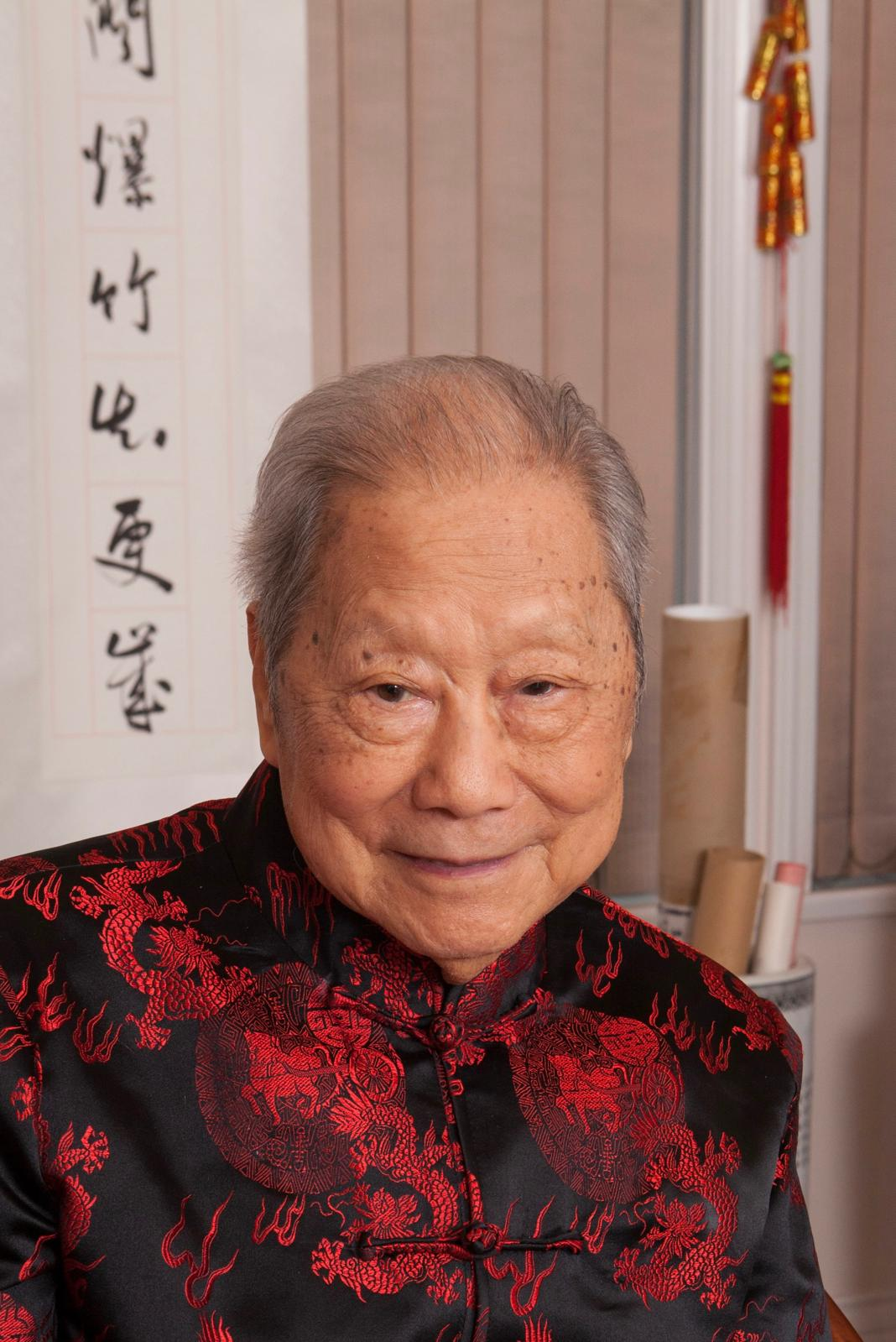
- Johnson Chow Su-sing (Zhou Shixin)
- Born: February 21, 1923; Suzhou, Jiangsu, China
- Died: May 11, 2021 (aged 98); Vancouver, British Columbia, Canada
- Citizenship: Chinese-Canadian
- Education: Suzhou Fine Arts College
- Known for: Painting, calligraphy
- Movement: Traditional Chinese literati painting (Wu School influences)
- Spouse: Lu Xinru (m. 1946; died 2011)
- Children: Frank Chow, Amelia Chow

Johnson Chow Su-sing (Chinese: 周士心; 21 February 1923 – 11 May 2021), also known as Zhou Shixin, was a Chinese-born Canadian painter, calligrapher and art educator working in the literati tradition of Chinese ink painting.

== Early life and education ==
Chow was born in Suzhou, Jiangsu, on 21 February 1923. He began painting at the age of eight under his father, Zhou Chilu; an uncle, Zhou Mutian, taught him poetry and calligraphy, and a brother taught bamboo painting and seal carving. He studied at Suzhou Fine Arts College, graduating in 1944, and received instruction in flower painting from Wu Silan, fruit and vegetables from Liu Junran, and birds and insects from Zhang Xingjie.

== Career ==
=== Hong Kong (1949–1971) ===
Chow moved to Hong Kong in June 1949. He taught at the Department of Fine Arts of New Asia College (later part of the Chinese University of Hong Kong) from 1962 to 1971. In Hong Kong he associated with painters including Wu Zishen and Zhang Daqian and published a book on his relationship with Zhang. He served as vice-chairman of the Hong Kong Chinese Art Club and held solo exhibitions; some works were shown in New York on the recommendation of the Hong Kong branch of the World Council of Churches. He published an album of eighty paintings in 1968.

=== United States and Canada (1971–2021) ===
In 1971 Chow moved to California, where he taught Chinese painting in the Department of Extramural Studies at the University of California, Los Angeles, and served as curator of Chinese art at the Pacific Asia Museum in Pasadena until 1980. He settled in Vancouver in 1980 and taught classical Chinese painting as a University of British Columbia extension course.

In 1993 he founded the Chinese Canadian Artists Federation in Vancouver and served as its first president. In 2012 he co-founded the Wu School Art Association.

== Work ==
Chow worked in landscape (shan shui), bird-and-flower painting and calligraphy, in a style associated with the Wu school of the Ming period. Later landscapes depicted sites outside China, including the Grand Canyon, the Canadian Rockies and Iguazu Falls. He wrote monographs on technique and history, including studies of Bada Shanren and of the "four gentlemen" subjects (plum, orchid, bamboo and chrysanthemum). A weekly column he wrote for Sing Tao Daily was collected as Hua qing hua qu (Painting Emotions and Interests) in 2004.

== Exhibitions, collections and honours ==
In 2011 the Hong Kong Museum of Art presented the exhibition Johnson Chow Su-sing: A Tranquil Heart in Art, which included works he donated to the museum. The National Museum of History in Taipei exhibited his work in 1978 and 1983.

His works are in the collections of the Hong Kong Museum of Art and other institutions in China, Taiwan, the United States, Canada and Singapore. Paintings have appeared at auction, including at Christie's.

In 2011 he received a British Columbia Community Achievement Award. After his death, tributes were entered in the Canadian House of Commons and reported in the British Columbia press.

== Personal life ==
Chow was married to Lu Xinru, who died in 2011; they had a son and a daughter. He died in Vancouver on 11 May 2021, aged 98.
